Khoda Box (1928 – January 15, 1990) was a Bangladeshi Baul singer and composer. He was awarded Ekushey Padak by the Government of Bangladesh in 1990 for his contribution to Baul music.

Career
Box began singing at the age of ten. He was a regular singer of Bangladesh Betar and Bangladesh Television. He spent most of his life at Lalon's shrine. He took part in establishing Lalon's shrine at Cheuriya in Kushtia.

Box composed around 900 Baul songs.

Personal life and legacy
Box was married to Rahela Khatun. They had a son Baul Abdul Latif Shah. In 1997, Khondokar Riazul Huq edited a book Moromi Kobi Khoda Box Shahconsisting 148 songs by Box.

Awards
 Ekushey Padak (1990)
 Bangla Academy Fellow (1985)

References

1928 births
Recipients of the Ekushey Padak
1990 deaths
20th-century Bangladeshi male singers
20th-century Bangladeshi singers
People from Chuadanga District
Honorary Fellows of Bangla Academy